Koen Van Langendonck (born 9 June 1989) is a Belgian professional footballer who plays as a goalkeeper for Belgian First Division A club Westerlo.

Career
Prior to the 2022-23 season, Van Langendonck signed a contract extension to keep him with K.V.C. Westerlo through the end of the 2023-24 season.

Honours
Westerlo

 Belgian First Division B: 2021–22

References

External links

1989 births
Living people
Belgian footballers
Beerschot A.C. players
K.V.C. Westerlo players
Belgian Pro League players
Challenger Pro League players

Association football goalkeepers